Thummalacheruvu is a village in Palnadu district of the Indian state of Andhra Pradesh. It is located in Piduguralla mandal of Guntur revenue division.

Government and politics 

Thummalacheruvu gram panchayat is the local self-government of the village. It is divided into wards and each ward is represented by a ward member. The ward members are headed by a Sarpanch.

Transport 
Tummalacheruvu railway station, situated on the Nallapadu-Pagidipalli section, serves the village with rail connectivity.

Education 

As per the school information report for the academic year 2018–19, the village has a total of 6 schools. These include 5 Zilla Parishad/Mandal Parishad and one private schools.

References 

Villages in Palnadu district